Taoniinae is a subfamily containing ten genera of glass squids.

Description

Unlike Cranchiinae , the other subfamily within Cranchiidae , Taoniinae all lack cartilaginous strips which extend back from the funnel-mantle point of fusion. Their funnels are free laterally, and they have one to three photophores on the eyes. The largest photophore is crescent-shaped for most genera, but it's triangular in Helicocranchia, a semicircle in Bathothauma, and circular in Sandalops. This is in contrast to glass squids in the subfamily Cranchiinae, which have at least four small photophores which are round or oval in shape.

In addition, males lack hectocotyli; these are arms which have evolved to specialize in storage and transfer of spermatophores to females. Taoniinae are also often larger than Cranchiinae and have darker beaks. Another characteristic is that a Taoniinae's caecum, is smaller than its stomach; in Cranchiinae, the caecum is larger than the stomach.

Taxonomic history and synonyms
When Georg Johann Pfeffer circumscribed this subfamily in 1912, he grouped its genera into three tribes:

 Taonius-like Taoniinae
 Phasmatopsis 
 Toxeuma 
 Taonius 
 Desmoteuthis 
 Megalocranchia 
 Taonidium 
 Crystalloteuthis 
 Phasmatoteuthion 
 Galiteuthis 
 Corynomma 
 Teuthowenia-like Taoniinae
 Teuthowenia 
 Bathothauma-like Taoniinae
 Bathothauma 

Synonyms of Taoniinae include Galiteuthinae  and Teuthoweniinae . S. Stillman Berry's 1912 circumscription of the subfamily Galiteuthinae only consisted of its type genus Galiteuthis . Like Pfeffer's Taoniinae, this was a subfamily within the family Cranchiidae . This was in contrast to Louis Joubin's classification, which placed Galiteuthis in a new, distinct family: Cranchionychiae . Georg Grimpe's 1922 circumscription of Teuthoweniinae included its type genus Teuthowenia  as well as Hensenioteuthis , Helicocranchia , and Sandalops . He placed the genus Bathothauma  into a new family, Bathothaumatidae , now just treated as a junior synonym of Cranchiidae. Subsequent research did not pay much heed to Grimpe's taxonomy.

Phylogeny
Below is Nancy A. Voss and Robert S. Voss's 1983 proposal for a phylogeny of the Taoniinae subfamily.

Genera and species

, the World Register of Marine Species classifies the Taoniinae as containing ten genera; they classify Belonella as a synonym of Taonius following Nancy A. Voss. However, Patrizia Jereb and Clyde F. E. Roper recognize Belonella as a distinct genus from Taonius, although they also note they are a frequently synonymized. Jereb and Roper also note Kir Nazimovich Nesis and Takashi Okutani as teuthologists who rejected Voss's synonymization of Belonella. Nesis's classification had Taonius consisting of only the single species T. pavo, and had Belonella consisting of B. belone , B. borealis  and an undescribed species from the Antarctic.

Genus Bathothauma 
Bathothauma lyromma 
Genus Egea 
Egea inermis 
Genus Galiteuthis 
Galiteuthis armata , armed cranch squid
Galiteuthis glacialis 
Galiteuthis pacifica 
Galiteuthis phyllura 
Galiteuthis suhmi 
Genus Helicocranchia 
Helicocranchia joubini 
Helicocranchia papillata 
Helicocranchia pfefferi 
Genus Liguriella 
Liguriella podophthalma 
Genus Megalocranchia 
Megalocranchia fisheri 
Megalocranchia maxima 
Megalocranchia oceanica 
Genus Mesonychoteuthis 
Mesonychoteuthis hamiltoni, colossal squid or Antarctic cranch squid
Genus Sandalops 
Sandalops melancholicus , sandal-eyed equid
Genus Taonius 
Taonius borealis 
Taonius pavo 
Taonius belone 
Genus Teuthowenia 
Teuthowenia maculata 
Teuthowenia megalops , Atlantic cranch squid
Teuthowenia pellucida , googly-eyed glass squid

Notes

References

External links

 
 

Squid
Taxa named by Georg Johann Pfeffer